Television in Moldova was introduced in 1958.

The following is a list of television channels broadcast in Moldova.

National 
 Moldova 1 (state owned) – 1st national network
 Moldova 2 (state owned) – 2nd national network
 Canal 2 retransmits programmes of, formerly: Antena Internațional and Antena 1 (Romania), now: TVR 1 (Romania) – 3rd national network
 Prime retransmits programmes of Channel One (ORT) (Russia) – 4th national network
 Gagauz Radyo Televiziyonu retransmits programmes of TRT Avaz (Turkey).
 Transnistria 1 is the only channel in Transnistria transmitting programmes in Russian, Ukrainian and Romanian (using Cyrillic script).

Regional 
 Canal 3 (semi-national)
 Naţional 4 (semi-national)
 Pervyi Pridnestrovsky (Transnistria)
 ProTV Chișinău (national), retransmits programmes of Pro TV (Romania)
 Publika TV (semi-national)
 STS Mega (semi-national), retransmits programmes of STS (Russia)
 Super TV (semi-national), retransmits programmes of SET (Russia)
 TSV (TV channel) (Transnistria)
 TV Gagauzia (Gagauzia), retransmits programmes of TRT Avaz (Turkey)
 TV Pink (Moldova) (semi-national) (coming soon)
 TVR Moldova (national), retransmits programmes of the Romanian Television channels
 TV8 (Moldova) (Chișinău and Bălți), retransmits programmes of NTV (Russia)
 Realitatea TV (semi-national)

Local 
 Albasat TV (Nisporeni), retransmits programmes of Jurnal TV
 Art TV (Zubresti), retransmits programmes of 1 Music Channel (Romania)
 ATV (Comrat), retransmits programmes of TVC21
 Bas TV (Basarabeasca), retransmits programmes of Mir (Russia)
 BTV (Bendery TV) (Tighina)
 Canal X (Briceni), retransmits programmes of TV Moldova International
 Drochia TV (Drochia), retransmits programmes of Jurnal TV
 Elita TV (Rezina, Orhei and Dubasari), retransmits programmes of Jurnal TV
 Eni Ay (Comrat), retransmits programmes of Mir (Russia)
 Euronova TV (Ungheni), retransmits programmes of Jurnal TV
 Impuls TV (Şoldăneşti), retransmits programmes of TV Moldova International
 Media TV (Cimişlia), retransmits programmes of Jurnal TV
 NTS (Taraclia), retransmits programmes of Mir (Russia)
 Rossiya-24 (Rîbnița), relay of television channel from Russia
 RTR Planeta (Slobozia), retransmits programmes of Rossiya 1 (Russia)
 Sor TV (Soroca)
 Studio L (Căuşeni), retransmits programmes of Jurnal TV
 TV Balti (Bălți)
 TV Prim (Glodeni)
 TV5 France (Chișinău), relay of television channel from France
 TV6 Balti (Bălți), retransmits programmes of STS Mega

Cable and digital terrestrial channels 
 Accent TV
 Alt TV
 Jurnal TV
 Noroc TV
 Perviy Kanal (Transnistria), retransmits programmes of Channel One (Russia)
 RTR Moldova, retransmits programmes of Russia-1 (Russia)
 NTV Moldova, retransmits programmes of NTV (Russia)
 RU TV Moldova, retransmits programmes of RU.TV (Russia)
 TVC21

Defunct 
 Muz-TV Moldova (semi-national), retransmitted programmes of Muz-TV (Russia)
 TV Moldova Internațional (state owned)

See also 
 Media of Moldova
 TeleRadio-Moldova
 List of Romanian-language television channels
 Television in Transnistria
 Euronova Media Group

References 

 

ro:Mass-media în Republica Moldova#Televiziune